Marquette County is a county located in the U.S. state of Wisconsin. As of the 2020 census, the population was 15,592. Its county seat is Montello. The county was created in 1836 from the Wisconsin Territory and organized in 1848.

Geography
The Mecan River, Buffalo Lake, and Puckaway Lake lie within Marquette County. The highest altitude in the county is a rocky area known as Mt. Shaw.

Major highways
  Interstate 39
  U.S. Highway 51
  Highway 22 (Wisconsin)
  Highway 23 (Wisconsin)
  Highway 73 (Wisconsin)
  Highway 82 (Wisconsin)

Railroads
Union Pacific

Buses
List of intercity bus stops in Wisconsin

Adjacent counties
 Waushara County - north
 Green Lake County - east
 Columbia County - south
 Adams County - west

National protected area
 Fox River National Wildlife Refuge

Demographics

2020 census
As of the census of 2020, the population was 15,592. The racial makeup of the county was 94.2% White, 0.4% Native American, 0.3% Asian, 0.3% Black or African American, 1.1% from other races, and 3.7% from two or more races. Ethnically, the population was 3.1% Hispanic or Latino of any race.

2000 census

As of the census of 2000, there were 15,832 people, 5,986 households, and 4,166 families residing in the county. The population density was 35 people per square mile (13/km2). There were 8,664 housing units at an average density of 19 per square mile (7/km2). The racial makeup of the county was 93.66% White, 3.44% Black or African American, 1.04% Native American, 0.27% Asian, 0.10% Pacific Islander, 0.38% from other races, and 1.11% from two or more races. 2.66% of the population were Hispanic or Latino of any race. 45.7% were of German, 8.2% Irish, 6.9% Polish, 6.1% English, 5.6% Norwegian and 5.1% American ancestry. 94.8% spoke English, 2.8% Spanish and 1.1% German as their first language.

There were 5,986 households, out of which 26.90% had children under the age of 18 living with them, 58.70% were married couples living together, 6.70% had a female householder with no husband present, and 30.40% were non-families. 25.40% of all households were made up of individuals, and 12.30% had someone living alone who was 65 years of age or older. The average household size was 2.41 and the average family size was 2.86.

In the county, the population was spread out, with 21.10% under the age of 18, 6.70% from 18 to 24, 28.90% from 25 to 44, 25.00% from 45 to 64, and 18.30% who were 65 years of age or older. The median age was 41 years. For every 100 females there were 118.90 males. For every 100 females age 18 and over, there were 123.70 males.

In 2017, there were 133 births, giving a general fertility rate of 65.1 births per 1000 women aged 15–44, the 29th highest rate out of all 72 Wisconsin counties. Of these, 11 of the births occurred at home. Additionally, there were 17 reported induced abortions performed on women of Marquette County residence in 2017, a figure higher than the records for the preceding four years.

Communities

City
 Montello (county seat)

Villages
 Endeavor
 Neshkoro
 Oxford
 Westfield

Towns

 Buffalo
 Crystal Lake
 Douglas
 Harris
 Mecan
 Montello (town)
 Moundville
 Neshkoro (town)
 Newton
 Oxford (town)
 Packwaukee
 Shields
 Springfield
 Westfield (town)

Census-designated place
 Packwaukee

Unincorporated communities

 Briggsville
 Budsin
 Buffalo Shore Estates
 Douglas Center
 Germania
 Glen Oak
 Harrisville
 Lawrence
 Mecan

Politics

See also
 National Register of Historic Places listings in Marquette County, Wisconsin

References

Further reading
 Portrait and Biographical Album of Green Lake, Marquette and Waushara Counties, Wisconsin. Chicago: Acme Publishing, 1890.

External links
 Marquette County government website
 Marquette County map from the Wisconsin Department of Transportation

 
1848 establishments in Wisconsin
Populated places established in 1848